Church Road railway station was a station in Edgbaston, Birmingham, England.

Church Road railway station may also refer to:
 Church Road (B&MJR) railway station, in Newport, South Wales
 Church Road Garston railway station, in Garston, Liverpool, England
 Harrington (Church Road Halt) railway station, in Cumbria, England
 St Mary Church Road railway station, in the Vale of Glamorgan, South Wales

See also
Church Street station (disambiguation)
Church station (disambiguation)